The White House Peace Vigil is an anti-nuclear weapons peace vigil started by William Thomas in 1981. Thomas believed it to be the longest running uninterrupted anti-war protest in U.S. history.

After Thomas's death in 2009, it was maintained around-the-clock by Concepción Picciotto until her death in 2016, and also by other volunteers to prevent the vigil from being dismantled by authorities.

History
Thomas launched the anti-nuclear vigil outside the White House in Lafayette Square, Washington, D.C. on June 3, 1981. He was later joined by Concepción Picciotto in August 1981 and Ellen Benjamin in April 1984. Over the years various other activists have joined them, including those from the Catholic Worker Movement, Plowshares Movement and Occupy D.C. It continued to be staffed by activists during Hurricane Sandy in 2012.

In 2013, the Peace Vigil was disassembled while it was briefly left unattended. It was restored the same day.

Influence
Thomas and the White House Peace Vigil inspired U.S. House of Representatives Delegate Eleanor Holmes Norton to introduce the Nuclear Disarmament and Economic Conversion Act, that would require the United States to disable and dismantle its nuclear weapons when all other nations possessing nuclear weapons do likewise. The Congresswoman has been introducing a version of the bill since 1994.

In the media
The Oracles of Pennsylvania Avenue, a 2012 documentary directed by Tim Wilkerson and commissioned by the Al Jazeera Documentary Channel, recounts the lives of anti-nuclear activists Thomas, Concepción Picciotto and Norman Mayer.

See also
 Countdown to Zero, 2010 documentary
 Parliament Square Peace Campaign
 Brian Haw
 List of peace activists

References

External links

 WHPeaceVigil.com
 Proposition One website
 The Oracles of Pennsylvania Avenue

1981 establishments in Washington, D.C.
Anti-nuclear protests in the United States
Anti-war protests in the United States
Peace camps
Peace vigil